Just to Let You Know... is the debut album by the British/Jamaican reggae artist Bitty McLean, released in 1993 by Brilliant Records and re-released by Virgin Records in 1994. It reached number 19 on the UK Albums Chart.

Several singles from the album charted, including "It Keeps Raining" (UK #2), "Pass It On" (UK #35), "Here I Stand" (UK #10), "Dedicated to the One I Love" (UK #6) and "What Goes Around" (UK #36).

Critical reception
The Independent wrote that "the result may not set the world on fire, but Bitty is nevertheless a welcome addition to the UK reggae scene."

Track listing
 "Here I Stand" (Justin Hinds) – 3:37 		
 "What Goes Round (Comes Around)" (Bitty McLean) – 3:42 		
 "True True True" (Ken Parker) – 3:22 		
 "I've Got Love" (Bitty McLean) – 4:14 		
 "Stop This World" (Leroy Sibbles) – 4:09 		
 "It Keeps Raining" (Dave Bartholomew, Fats Domino, Robert Guidry) – 3:45 		
 "Dedicated to the One I Love" (Ralph Bass, Lowman Pauling) – 3:53 		
 "Forever Be Mine" (Bitty McLean) – 3:55 		
 "Talkin' to the Wind" (Norman Whitfield) – 3:48 		
 "Pass It On" (Jean Watt) – 5:04 		
 "Pass It On (Reprise)" (Jean Watt) – 4:15

References

1993 debut albums
Bitty McLean albums
Virgin Records albums